CAF Sepia is a family of high-speed electric multiple unit trains built by CAF and used in Spain and Turkey. The Sepia is based on the Class 120 high-speed trains manufactured by CAF for the Renfe Operadora (RENFE). The Renfe Operadora was the first to order CAF high speed trains; it ordered 12 of these units in 2001, the Turkish State Railways (TCDD) 12 units. The trains were delivered in 2004 for service. The trains were labelled and marketed as the Sepia by their manufacturer, CAF.

RENFE Class 120/121

RENFE ordered twelve units in 2001, and a further 45 units in 2004

29 units of the class RENFE Class 121 were ordered for medium-distance high-speed Avant services. The units are very similar to the Class 120 but include additional electrical equipment for redundancy (a requirement for trains using the Guadarrama Tunnel), and do not provide first class seating, raising the number of seats to 282.

HT65000

Turkish State Railways ordered 12 Sepia tilting trains for its main lines. The 6-car trains, delivered as HT65000, were derived from the Alvia Class 120, 121.The HT65000 can reach a maximum speed of 250 km/h, in revenue service on the Turkish high-speed railway network, the maximum it reaches is 250 km/h between Istanbul Haydarpaşa railway station and Ankara Railway Station stations and between Ankara Railway Station and Konya Railway Station.

The first set left Spain on November 10, 2007 and arrived in Turkey at Kapıkule on November 20, 2007. Later, 4 more sets came to Turkey in 2008, 3 more in 2009 and 2 more in 2010. On March 13 2009  YHT service was started by one of these sets. Subsequently, 2 additional sets were ordered with the same characteristics, reaching a total of twelve HT65000 trains.

See also
 Pendolino
 New Pendolino
 Bombardier Regina
 ICE T
 List of high-speed trains

References

High-speed trains
Passenger trains running at least at 250 km/h in commercial operations